The 2018 season of the Taiwan Football Premier League (TFPL) is the second season of top-flight association football competition in Taiwan under its current format. The Taiwan Football Premier League includes eight teams. The season began in April 2018. Tatung FC finished at the top of the table, with that result, Tatung FC won the League and  earned an automatic berth in the 2018 AFC Cup. However, Hang Yuen was granted the AFC Cup berth after the champions declined the AFC invitation in order to focus on next season.

Teams 

The eight league teams are:

 F.C. Taicheng Lions
 Hang Yuen F.C.
 Hasus TSU F.C.
 National Sports Training Center F.C.
 Royal Blues F.C.
 Tainan City F.C.
 Tatung F.C.
 Taipower F.C.

Qualification

Four teams entered the qualification stages of the tournament to play in the 2018 season of the TFPL. These teams were Ming Chuan University, Tainan City, Taicheng Lions and Bear Bro Ilan. Ming Chuan University and Tainan City were at the bottom of the chart in 2017. FC Taicheng and Bear Bro Ilan were new entrants in 2018.    

The games took place on January 27–29, 2018. Taicheng Lions and Tainan City finished first and second in the group, qualifying them for the league season.

League table

The season began on April 15, 2018

Top scorers

As of 9 October 2018

References

External links
Chinese Taipei Football Association

 

2018
2018 in Asian association football leagues
2018 in Taiwanese football